The 27th Awit Awards were held at the Newport Performing Arts Theater in Resorts World Manila, Pasay. They honored the best of Filipino music for the year 2013. 

Gloc-9 received the most nominations with nine. He was followed by Thyro Alfaro and Ito Rapadas with seven. Jumbo De Belen and Jonathan Manalo came next receiving six nods.

The awards night was hosted by Marion Aunor and Josh Padilla. Gloc-9 won most of the awards with six.

Winners and nominees
Winners are listed first and highlighted in bold. Nominated producers, composers and lyricists are not included in this list, unless noted. For the full list, please go to their official website.

Performance Awards

Creativity Awards

Technical Achievement Awards

Digital Awards

Note:

The awards were given specifically to the composers, instead of the recording artists/groups.

Special Award

References

External links
 Official Website of the Awit Awards

Awit Awards
2014 music awards
Awit